The Charge at Feather River is a 1953 American Western film directed by Gordon Douglas. It was originally released in 3D with many arrows, lances, and other weapons flying directly at the audience in several scenes.

The movie is most notable for originating the name of the "Wilhelm scream", a sound effect used in the Star Wars film series, as well as countless other movies including the Indiana Jones franchise, Disney cartoons and The Lord of the Rings film series. In February 2018 it was announced that Star Wars will no longer use the Wilhelm scream. Sound designer Ben Burtt named the sound after "Pvt. Wilhelm", a minor character in the film who emits the famous scream after being shot by an arrow (although the recording actually originated in the Gary Cooper film Distant Drums in 1951). When the film screened at the Second World 3-D Expo at Hollywood's Egyptian Theatre in 2006, much of the film-savvy audience broke into applause when Pvt. Wilhelm screamed.

The climax of the film has many similarities to the 1868 Battle of Beecher Island, though instead of Army frontier scouts, Madison's character recruits "the Guardhouse Brigade" from Army prisoners and arms them with repeating rifles. Some have also noticed that the plot bears a number of similarities to the later Major Dundee, directed by Sam Peckinpah in 1965, notably the journey leading up to the climactic stand-off.

Cast
 Guy Madison as Miles Archer  
 Frank Lovejoy as Sgt. Charlie Baker  
 Helen Westcott as Anne McKeever  
 Vera Miles as Jennie McKeever  
 Dick Wesson as Pvt. Cullen  
 Onslow Stevens as Grover Johnson  
 Steve Brodie as Pvt. Ryan  
 Ron Hagerthy as Johnny McKeever  
 Fay Roope as Lt. Col. Kilrain  
 Neville Brand as Pvt. Morgan  
 Henry Kulky as Pvt. Smiley  
 Lane Chandler as Pvt. Zebulan Poinsett  
 Fred Carson as Chief Thunder Hawk  
James Brown as Pvt. Connors
 Ralph Brooks as Pvt. Wilhelm (scream voiced by Sheb Wooley)

References

External links 
 
 
 

1953 films
1953 Western (genre) films
American Western (genre) films
1953 3D films
American 3D films
Films directed by Gordon Douglas
Films scored by Max Steiner
Warner Bros. films
Western (genre) cavalry films
1950s English-language films
1950s American films